Ozric Tentacles are an English instrumental rock band, whose music incorporates elements from a diverse range of genres, including psychedelic rock, progressive rock, space rock, jazz fusion, electronic music, dub music, world music, and ambient music. Formed in Somerset in 1983, the band has released over 30 albums selling over a million copies worldwide despite never having signed to a major recording label. Throughout many line-up changes over the years, co-founder and guitarist Ed Wynne has remained the only original member of the band. The band is now credited as one of the major influences of the UK festival scene's re-emergence, becoming particularly associated with the Glastonbury Festival and their handmade series of cassette releases, mostly sold at gigs and through a fan club.

History

The Cassette Years: 1983–1989 
Ozric Tentacles formed at the Stonehenge Free Festival in 1983, where the brothers Ed and Roly Wynne, along with drummer Nick "Tig" Van Gelder, bassist Eddie Myer and keyboardist Joie Hinton, performed as a group originally known as Bolshem People. After playing a six-hour jam session, the group was asked the name of their band, to which Ed Wynne replied, "Ozric Tentacles". This name was one of the ideas, alongside "Malcolm Segments," that had come up in a humorous conversation the band had about possible names for weird or alien breakfast cereals, hence the references to breakfast cereal in several album titles and covers. According to Wynne, "'Ozric' is an old Viking name meaning 'divine energy', and 'tentacles' is a silly word to put on the end" (though in fact the name Osric comes from Old English; its elements mean 'god' and 'ruler'). The music scene in early-mid 1980s England allowed the band to make use of the re-emergence of free festivals to spread their music. Underground attention for their style of psychedelic rock – which makes prominent use of synthesizers, guitars, and samplers – allowed the band to surge. Notoriety spread mostly through the circulation of bootleg cassettes in the early years, which were welcomed by the band.

Gigs were often spontaneous during this period, for the lineup of the Ozrics was fluid. Shows often consisted of whoever was available to perform that night, due to the large number of people within the band. Granted there was power available, the band would often perform for a long time, sometimes until sunrise. It was not uncommon for members of the Ozrics to contribute to other musical collaborations. This practice has stayed with the band since its origination, and has allowed many members to come and go. In 1984, the first major lineup change occurred when second guitarist, Gavin Griffiths, left the band to form The Ulluators with fellow member Joie on keyboards.

The following year saw the first official cassette release of Erpsongs, which originally did not have track titles. This was possibly due to the album being a collection of songs recorded over three years. The next release, Tantric Obstacles, was released the same year and was intended to be more of an album. These early recordings were sometimes consisting solely of Ed Wynne playing the guitars, bass, and synths. All were recorded on a TEAC 4-track reel-to-reel at their attic studio in Rushmere, a converted farmhouse on Wimbledon Common in London. Some tracks on the cassette albums are performed with a drum machine, due to the studio lacking the necessary soundproofing. As a result of two official releases, the band's popularity began to rise. This led to fans sending in blank cassettes with the intent of them being filled with live or unreleased music. The Ozrics obliged. Eventually, the demand became too much for an independent band to manage. This resulted in the third release, Live Ethereal Cereal, being a live compilation album of concerts between 1985 and 1986.

The band's sound began to adopt a wider repertoire of music towards the end of 1986. This is especially illustrated on the fourth cassette release, There is Nothing. Songs now began to highlight a space rock vibe, with flavours of reggae. This, Wynne says, was not intended, but was the result of seeing the band Here & Now perform live. The addition of more world music (through sampling and performing) was the result of Joie Hinton travelling to India and Ed to Thailand. There is also a noticeable rise in quality on the 1986 release of There is Nothing, due to the purchase of a new 8-track tape machine. This allowed for more synth overdubbing and real drum tracks.

More lineup changes than ever before occurred around this time, most notably the addition of the front-man, "Jumping" John Egan and the departure of keyboardist Tom Brooks in 1987. This created a sonic gap for Ed Wynne to fill. Coincidentally, earlier in the year, Ed was busy writing "chill-out music" with his side-project Nodens Ictus, so the idea of improving his own synth skills inspired him. Despite more changes and collaborations, they managed to release Sliding Gliding Worlds in 1988, shortly before drummer Tig Velder departed from the band and was replaced with 21-year-old Merv Pepler. 1989 saw the last cassette release by the band with The Bits Between the Bits, which was a collection of unreleased recordings between 1985 and 1989. This was a filler album while the band was preparing for its first vinyl release the same year.

Dovetail Records: 1989–present 
In 1989, the band started their own label, Dovetail Records, with its first release, Pungent Effulgent. The album was originally released on vinyl, but saw a CD release the following year. The band also began to receive commercial recognition around this time, exemplified by their performance with the singer-songwriter Donovan at the Glastonbury Festival on 18 June 1989. This was followed by Erpland in 1990, a double album. Next year the band reached their first No. 1 recognition in the UK Indie Chart with their single "Sploosh!" from Strangeitude. In approximately 1992, the band decided to create their own recording studio to cut down on the costs of recording an album. The studio, coined "The Mill", was refurbished from an old water mill.

By 1993, Jurassic Shift album reached the Top 20 of the UK Albums Chart and No. 1 in the UK Indie Chart, spending a total of three months in the charts.

The band has gone through myriad line-up changes, with Ed Wynne being the only constant presence since the beginning. In early years, many members left to pursue similar musical projects. Nevertheless, throughout the 1990s and 2000s, the band has released albums with a prolific rate, continues to tour extensively and has maintained its identity and trademark sound. The band is famous for their live performances, in which they have long taken an audiovisual approach with elaborate lighting and projections. Currently, the band features Ed Wynne and his son Silas Neptune on keyboards and Hungarian drummer Balázs Szende on drums and percussion.

In June 2012, the Wynnes' house in Colorado was destroyed by wild fires that had ravaged the area for over a week. The band was on tour at the time. Archived material was destroyed, as was their studio and some instruments. After the fire, the band sought help from fans to help rebuild the archive.

The band toured in 2021–22, as Ozric Electronic, across venues in the UK, with members Ed Wynne and Silas Neptune.

The band (Ed Wynne, Silas Neptune, Brandi Wynne, Tim Wallander, along with Saskia Maxwell) toured with Gong in November-December 2022.

Musical style

The music of Ozric Tentacles is a combination of driving basslines, keyboards and intricate guitar work, with a sound strongly influenced by Steve Hillage and Gong. Many of the songs incorporate unusual time signatures and Eastern-influenced modes. Furthermore, the band often uses complex arrangements, which include changes in time signature, key and tempo over the course of the track. The arrangements also take influence from funk, jazz fusion, dub, reggae and ambient music. These features are frequently mixed with electronic elements, including densely layered arpeggiated synthesizers, pads, synth basslines, effects and programmed drumbeats. Ozric Tentacles also use a wide range of instruments in their performances. In addition to regular rock band instruments, woodwinds, ethnic percussion, koto, saz and sitar have appeared throughout their music.

According to a number of interviews over the years, the band does not listen to music as much as they write and record music.

The vast majority of their songs are instrumentals. In Ed Wynne's words, this is because, "I've never really liked vocals. Words always get in the way, make everything too specific. Our music is more about creating moods and giving the listener the chance to get whatever they want out of it. Music is better than singing." Minor exceptions to this would be "Dissolution" off of Pungent Effulgent and "Iscense" from the album Erpland. The band's spare use of vocals came primarily when Jumping John Egan was a member. Occasionally during live gigs, he would write poetry and shout it during the song.

Discography

Early cassette-only albums
Erpsongs (1985)
Tantric Obstacles (1985)
Live Ethereal Cereal (1986)
There Is Nothing (1986)
Sliding Gliding Worlds (1988)
The Bits Between the Bits (1989)

The first six cassette-only albums were self-released before the band began recording and releasing material on CD under the label. These first six albums were released in 1993 as a CD box-set called Vitamin Enhanced. The albums were later re-released as a series of three double-disc packages, followed by a remastered reissue of the original box in 2014. In 2015, the albums were released as remastered double-LPs. In 2021, the six albums were remastered again and reissued with a 48-page book.

Studio albums

Pungent Effulgent (1989)
Erpland (1990)
Strangeitude (1991)
Jurassic Shift (1993)
Arborescence (1994)
Become the Other (1995)
Curious Corn (1997)
Waterfall Cities (1999)
The Hidden Step (2000)
Spirals in Hyperspace (2004)
The Floor's Too Far Away (2006)
The Yumyum Tree (2009)
Paper Monkeys (2011)
Technicians of the Sacred (2015)
Space for the Earth (2020)
Space for the Earth + 6 Worlds, an Unusual Journey (2020)

Live albums
Live Underslunky (1992)
Spice Doubt (1998)
Live at the Pongmaster's Ball (2002)
Sunrise Festival (2008)
Live in Italy (2010)
Live at the Academy Manchester 1992 (2011)
Live at One World Frome Festival 1997 (2011)
Live in Oslo (2011)
Live in Milan (2012)
Live in Pordenone, Italy (2013)

Compilation albums
Afterswish (1992)
Vitamin Enhanced (1993)
Swirly Termination (2000)
Eternal Wheel (The Best Of) (2004)
Introducing (2013)

Remixes album
Floating Seeds Remixed (1999)

Singles and EPs
Sploosh! (1991)
Wob Glass / Neurochasm (1999)
Oakum (2001)
Pyramidion (2001)
Chewier (Eat Static Remix) (2004)
Xingu (Cosmic Butterfly Remix) (2015)
Humboldt Currant (2020)

Band members

Current
 Ed Wynne – guitars, keyboards, samples, koto, bass, fretless bass, drum programming (1983–present)
 Silas Neptune – keyboards, synthesizer, guitar, samples, saz (2009–present)
 Brandi Wynne – bass, keyboards (2004–2016, 2022)
 Tim Wallander – drums, percussion (2022–present)

Former

 Roly Wynne – bass (1983–1992)
 Joie "Ozrooniculator" Hinton – keyboards, samples, synthesizer (1983–1994)
 Nick "Tig" Van Gelder – drums (1983–1988)
 Eddie Myer – bass (1983–1984)
 Tom "Zorch" Brooks – keyboards (1983–1987)
 Gavin Griffiths – guitar (1983–1984)
 Merv Pepler – drums, percussion (1989–1994)
 Marcus "Carcus" Diess – ethnic percussion (1988–1990, 1993)
 Generator John – drums, percussion (1989–1993)
 "Jumping" John Egan – flute (1987–2005)
 Zia Geelani – bass (1992–2004)
 Steve Everitt – bass, keyboards (1993)
 Conrad "Rad" Prince – drums, percussion (1994–2001)
 Chris "Seaweed" Lenox-Smith – keyboards, synthesizer (1994–2004)
 Johnny Morgan – drums (2000)
 Stuart "Stu" Fisher – drums, percussion (2000–2004)
 Paul Godfrey – bass (2003–2004)
 Steve Hillage – guitar (2004)
 Harry Waters – keyboards (2004)
 Matt "Metro" Shmigelsky – drums (2004–2005)
 Greyum May – bass (2004–2005, 2006)
 Vinny Shillito – Bass (1990–1992, 2006–2012)
 Alan "Haggis" Haggarty – bass (2005)
 Paul Chousmer – keyboards (2006)
 Oliver Seagle – drums (2006–2013)
 Roy Brosh – drums (2009)
 Paul Hankin – percussion (1985–1991, 2013–Present )
 Balázs Szende – drums, percussion (2012–2016)

Additional information
 Roly Wynne was a major force in shaping the Ozric Tentacles sound in the beginning. His later life was plagued with difficulties and he killed himself in 1999.
 Gavin Griffiths left the early line-up to form an alternative rock band The Ullulators.
 Harry Waters, the son of former Pink Floyd bassist Roger Waters, toured with the band in 2004.
 Merv Pepler and Joie Hinton formed Eat Static in 1989. They toured in parallel with Ozric Tentacles for several years until 1994, when the two left the band to pursue Eat Static full-time. Pepler and Hinton have also occasionally collaborated with Ed Wynne as Nodens Ictus.
 Chris "Seaweed" Lenox-Smith was previously a member of the Thunderdogs, Damidge, Moksha etc. and appeared with Dusters at Dawn at the 1986 Stonehenge Free Festival. He worked on numerous parallel projects, being a permanent member in Ozric Tentacles, Eat Static and ZubZub while collaborating with numerous musicians including Marco Lippe of Twenty Four Hours.
 Zia Geelani formed an electronic music project ZubZub after departing Ozric Tentacles in 2004.
 "Jumping" John Egan is now playing with space rock project Dream Machine. He has also played with ZubZub as well as his own band Champignon.
 Stuart "Stu" Fisher was the drummer of Hole and psychedelic rock band Keepers Brew. He is currently running a recording studio.
 Greyum May has a psychedelic project called Keepers Brew with guitarist Stu Brewer.
 Paul Godfrey now plays bass in The Cellar Door Sound.
 Paul Chousmer now plays with Another Green World, Webcore, Zuvuya, Astralasia and works as a sound engineer. He is also Musical Director and keyboard player for the Wessex Big Band, and a former lecturer of music at Yeovil College.
 Nick "Tig" Van Gelder played in Jamiroquai in 1992–1993.
 Johnny Morgan is the drummer for Senser, and also played for Moke and Lodestar.

Miscellaneous
The AV-400 MHz NMR machine of the chemistry department of The University of Warwick (UK) is nicknamed "Ozric" in honour of the band, allegedly by NMR expert and Ozric Tentacles fan Jon Rourke.

References

External links

 Official website

Jam bands
I.R.S. Records artists
Livetronica music groups
Musical groups established in 1983
English psychedelic rock music groups
English space rock musical groups
English progressive rock groups
British instrumental musical groups
Magna Carta Records artists
Jazz fusion ensembles